Justin Sangster (born 30  November 1996) is a New Zealand rugby union player who plays for the  in Super Rugby. His playing position is lock. He was named in the Hurricanes squad for the 2022 Super Rugby Pacific season. He was also a member of the  2021 Bunnings NPC squad.

References

External links
itsrugby.co.uk profile

New Zealand rugby union players
Living people
Rugby union locks
Bay of Plenty rugby union players
Hurricanes (rugby union) players
Year of birth missing (living people)
People educated at Aquinas College, Tauranga